In mathematics, in the field of group theory, a paranormal subgroup is a subgroup such that the subgroup generated by it and any conjugate of it, is also generated by it and a conjugate of it within that subgroup.

Equivalently, a subgroup is paranormal if its weak closure and normal closure coincide in all intermediate subgroups.

Here are some facts relating paranormality to other subgroup properties:

 Every pronormal subgroup, and hence, every normal subgroup and every abnormal subgroup, is paranormal.
 Every paranormal subgroup is a polynormal subgroup.
 In finite solvable groups, every polynormal subgroup is paranormal.

External links

Subgroup properties